Latiaxis is a genus of medium-sized sea snails, marine gastropod mollusks in the family Muricidae, subfamily Coralliophilinae, the coral snails or coral shells.

Species
Species within the genus Latiaxis include:
 Latiaxis bernardi K. Nicolay, 1984
 Latiaxis cerinamarumai Kosuge, 1980
 Latiaxis filiaris Shikama, 1978
 Latiaxis hayashii Shikama, 1966
 Latiaxis kawamurai Kuroda, 1959
 Latiaxis laevicostatus Kosuge, 1981
 Latiaxis mawae (Gray in Griffith & Pidgeon, 1834)
 Latiaxis pilsbryi Hirase, 1908

Species mentioned in ITIS  
 Latiaxis costatus (Blainville, 1832) - California coralsnail
 Latiaxis dalli (Emerson and D'Attilio, 1963)
 Latiaxis juliae Clench and Aquayo, 1939
 Latiaxis kincaidi Dall, 1919
 Latiaxis mansfieldi (McGinty, 1940)

The Indo-Pacific Molluscan Database also adds the following species with names in current use 
 Latiaxis latipinnatus Azuma, 1961

Species from New Zealand  
 Latiaxis lischkeanus (Dunker, 1882) 

Synonyms
 Latiaxis armatus G.B. Sowerby III, 1912: synonym of Babelomurex armatus (G.B. Sowerby III, 1912)
 Latiaxis babelis (Requien, 1849) and Latiaxis cariniferus (Sowerby G.B. I, 1834) are synonyms for Babelomurex cariniferus (Sowerby, 1834)
 Latiaxis benoiti (Tiberi, 1855): synonym of Babelomurex benoiti (Tiberi, 1855)
 Latiaxis cariniferoides Shikama, 1966: synonym of Babelomurex cariniferoides (Shikama, 1966)
 Latiaxis cariniferus (Sowerby G.B. I, 1834): synonym of Babelomurex cariniferus (Sowerby, 1834)
 Latiaxis castaneocinctus Kosuge, 1980: synonym of Babelomurex princeps (Melvill, 1912)
 Latiaxis chiangi Lan, 1982: synonym of Coralliophila abnormis (E.A. Smith, 1878)
 Latiaxis couturieri Jousseaume, 1898: synonym of Babelomurex couturieri (Jousseaume, 1898)
 Latiaxis echinatus Azuma, 1960: synonym of Babelomurex echinatus (Azuma, 1960)
 Latiaxis elstoni Barnard, 1962: synonym of Toxiclionella elstoni (Barnard, 1962)
 Latiaxis fearnleyi Emerson & D'Attilio, 1965: synonym of Coralliophila fearnleyi (Emerson & D'Attilio, 1965)
 Latiaxis fenestratus Kosuge, 1980: synonym of Babelomurex wormaldi (Powell, 1971)
 Latiaxis filiaregis Kurohara, 1959: synonym of Hirtomurex filiaregis (Kurohara, 1959)
 Latiaxis fruticosus Kosuge, 1979: synonym of Babelomurex fruticosus (Kosuge, 1979)
 Latiaxis gemmatus Shikama, 1966: synonym of Babelomurex diadema (A. Adams, 1854)
 Latiaxis helenae Azuma, 1973: synonym of Babelomurex fusiformis (Martens, 1902)
 Latiaxis jeanneae D'Attilio & Myers, 1984: synonym of Babelomurex spinosus (Hirase, 1908)
 Latiaxis kanamarui Shikama, 1978: synonym of Babelomurex indicus (E.A. Smith, 1899)
 Latiaxis kawanishii Kosuge, 1979: synonym of Babelomurex kawanishii (Kosuge, 1979)
 Latiaxis kieneri Hidalgo, 1904: synonym of Babelomurex indicus (E.A. Smith, 1899)
 Latiaxis kiranus Kuroda, 1959: synonym of Babelomurex indicus (E.A. Smith, 1899)
 Latiaxis macutanica Kosuge, 1979: synonym of Babelomurex diadema (A. Adams, 1854)
 Latiaxis mamimarumai Kosuge, 1981: synonym of Mipus mamimarumai (Kosuge, 1981)
 Latiaxis marumai Habe & Kosuge, 1970: synonym of Babelomurex marumai (Habe & Kosuge, 1970)
 Latiaxis mediopacificus Kosuge, 1979: synonym of Babelomurex mediopacificus (Kosuge, 1979)
 Latiaxis michikoae Shikama, 1978: synonym of Babelomurex indicus (E.A. Smith, 1899)
 Latiaxis multispinosus Shikama, 1966: synonym of Babelomurex spinosus (Hirase, 1908)
 Latiaxis nagahorii Kosuge, 1980: synonym of Babelomurex nagahorii (Kosuge, 1980)
 Latiaxis nakamigawai Kuroda, 1959: synonym of Babelomurex nakamigawai (Kuroda, 1959)
 Latiaxis nakayasui Shikama, 1970: synonym of Babelomurex nakayasui (Shikama, 1970)
 Latiaxis princeps: synonym of Babelomurex princeps (Melvill, 1912) 
 Latiaxis purpuraterminus Kosuge, 1979 : synonym of Babelomurex purpuraterminus (Kosuge, 1979)
 Latiaxis sallei Jousseaume, 1884 : synonym of Babelomurex japonicus (Dunker, 1882)
 Latiaxis scobina Kilburn, 1973 : synonym of Hirtomurex winckworthi (Fulton, 1930)
 Latiaxis sentix (Bayer, 1971) : synonym of Babelomurex sentix (Bayer, 1971)
 Latiaxis shingomarumai Kosuge, 1981 : synonym of Babelomurex shingomarumai (Kosuge, 1981) 
 Latiaxis sibogae Schepman, 1911 : synonym of Pazinotus sibogae (Schepman, 1911)
 Latiaxis spinosus Hirase, 1908 : synonym of Babelomurex spinosus (Hirase, 1908)
 Latiaxis teramachii Kuroda, 1959 : synonym of Hirtomurex teramachii (Kuroda, 1959)
 Latiaxis tortilis A. Adams, 1867 : synonym of Mipus gyratus (Hinds, 1844)
 Latiaxis tortuosus Azuma, 1961 : synonym of Mipus tortuosus (Azuma, 1961)
 Latiaxis tosanus Hirase, 1908 : synonym of Babelomurex tosanus (Hirase, 1908)
 Latiaxis translucida Kosuge, 1981 : synonym of Hirtomurex winckworthi (Fulton, 1930)
 Latiaxis tuberosus Kosuge, 1980 : synonym of Babelomurex tuberosus (Kosuge, 1980)
 Latiaxis tumidus Kosuge, 1980 : synonym of Babelomurex tumidus (Kosuge, 1980)
 Latiaxis vicdani Kosuge, 1980: synonym of Mipus vicdani (Kosuge, 1980)
 Latiaxis winckworthi Fulton, 1930 : synonym of Hirtomurex winckworthi (Fulton, 1930)
 Latiaxis wormaldi Powell, 1971: synonym of Babelomurex wormaldi (Powell, 1971)

References

 Gofas, S.; Le Renard, J.; Bouchet, P. (2001). Mollusca, in: Costello, M.J. et al. (Ed.) (2001). European register of marine species: a check-list of the marine species in Europe and a bibliography of guides to their identification. Collection Patrimoines Naturels, 50: pp. 180–213
 Spencer, H.; Marshall. B. (2009). All Mollusca except Opisthobranchia. In: Gordon, D. (Ed.) (2009). New Zealand Inventory of Biodiversity. Volume One: Kingdom Animalia. 584 pp

Further reading 
 Powell A. W. B., New Zealand Mollusca, William Collins Publishers Ltd, Auckland, New Zealand 1979 

 
Muricidae
Taxonomy articles created by Polbot